Water Tower No. 2 is an octagonal water tower in Zheleznodorozhny District of Novosibirsk, Russia. It was built in 1902.

Description
The tower was built of brick and wood, has three tiers and stands on a rusticated plinth of granite stones.

Bibliography

External links
 Водонапорная башня у тоннельного перехода. Novosibdom.ru.

Water towers in Novosibirsk
Towers completed in 1902
Cultural heritage monuments of regional significance in Novosibirsk Oblast